Jonas Kilmork Vemøy (born 12 October 1986 in Oslo, Norway) is a Norwegian Jazz musician (trumpet) and composer, member of Maridalen jazz trio, and also known from collaborations within a series of bands and album releases. He was raised in Larvik in the county of Vestfold.

Career 
Vemøy was educated at Norwegian Academy of Music (2007–2011) in Oslo, where he studied under teachers Torgrim Sollid and Eckhard Baur. Residing in Oslo he started working as a trumpet teacher educator at the Academy of Music autumn 2011, beside the collaboration within the bands "Blokk 5", Lama, Kristin Minde Band, Pixel, "Simra", "Filter" and Lise Hvoslef Band among other projects. The gig by "Pixel", including the front figure double bassist and vocalist Ellen Andrea Wang, saxophonist Harald Lassen and drummer Jon Audun Baar, was noted as "one of the most memorable moments" of the Match and Fuse Festival, by the Jazz magazine Down Beat.

Honors 
2013: Featured at Young Nordic Jazz Comets within Pixel

Discography 
Within Maridalen
2021: Maridalen (Jazzland Recordings)

Within "Blokk 5»
2007: Scandals and Animals ( Records)
2011: Sing your hart out! (Kennel Records)

Within Lama
2009: Guidebook To Lamaland (Spoon Train Audio)
2009: Look What You Made Us Do (Spoon Train Audio)
2011: Endless Repeats (Spoon Train Audio)

Within Pixel
2012: Reminder (Cuneiform Records)
2013: We are all small pixels (Cuneiform Records)
2015: Golden Years (Cuneiform Records)

Within Kristin Minde Band
2011: Six Feet Over (VME)
2013: The Weight (VME)

With other projects
2009: If You Don't Have Time To Cook, You Don't Have Time To Live (LP Records), with "Lasse Passage»
2009: Leave Your Friends And Family (Musikkoperatørene), with "The Captain & Me»
2009: På Lag (MUDI), with "Team Båt»
2010: Maneten Medusa (Schmell), with Åshild Watne
2011: Walk in the Light (MUDI), with Jens Andreas Kleieven
2011: Fridas Fabelaktige Ferie (Musikk-Husets Forlag), with Tone Ophus
2011: Hope is happiness (LS Music), with Hilde Dahl
2012: The Rise and Fall (Sony Music), with "Casa Murilo"
2014: Mapping the Coincidence (Lise Hvoslef Records), with Lise Hvoslef
2014: Kråkesølv (Jansen Plateproduksjon), with Kråkesølv

References

External links 
Pixel Official Website
Lama er et undervanns-monster at Dagbladet (in Norwegian)

21st-century Norwegian trumpeters
Norwegian jazz trumpeters
Male trumpeters
Norwegian jazz composers
1986 births
Living people
Musicians from Larvik
Male jazz composers
21st-century Norwegian male musicians
Pixel (band) members